Stadio Sergio Lanfranchi, previously known as Stadio XXV Aprile, is a sports stadium dedicated to rugby union, located in the city of Parma in the Emilia-Romagna region of northern Italy.  It replaced the original Stadio Sergio Lanfranchi which was demolished in July 2008.

It is a 5,000 seat arena which hosts Crociati Parma Rugby FC and Gran Parma Rugby rugby union teams.  It also hosts the Parma Panthers American football team.  In 2012 it also became the home stadium of the Zebre Parma franchise which replaced Aironi in the Pro12 league and Heineken Cup.

In January 2015, the Stadio XXV Aprile was renamed as the Stadio Sergio Lanfranchi, the previous stadium of that name having been demolished.

References 

Rugby union stadiums in Italy
Buildings and structures in Parma
Sports venues in Emilia-Romagna
Zebre Parma